The 2014 Toyota Grand Prix of Long Beach was the 40th annual running of the Toyota Grand Prix of Long Beach and the second race of the 2014 IndyCar Series season. It took place on April 13, 2014 in Long Beach, California on its temporary street circuit. It was won by Mike Conway.

Classification

Qualifying

Race results

Notes
 Points include 1 point for leading at least 1 lap during a race, an additional 2 points for leading the most race laps, and 1 point for Pole Position.

Championship standings after the race

Drivers' Championship standings

Manufacturer standings

 Note: Only the top five positions are included.

References

Long Beach
Grand Prix of Long Beach
Grand Prix of Long Beach
Toyota Grand Prix of Long Beach